Scoliocentra villosa  is a species of fly in the family Heleomyzidae. It is found in the  Palearctic .

References

External links
Images representing Scoliocentra villosa  at BOLD

Heleomyzidae
Insects described in 1830
Muscomorph flies of Europe
Taxa named by Johann Wilhelm Meigen